Diagourou may refer to:

 Diagourou, Burkina Faso, a town in Coalla Department, Gnagna Province, Burkina Faso
 Diagourou, Niger, a village and rural commune in Niger